English civil procedure shares much in common with the civil law systems of other common law countries.

The civil courts of England and Wales adopted an overwhelmingly unified body of rules as a result of the Woolf Reforms on 26 April 1999. These are collectively known as the Civil Procedure Rules and in all but some very confined areas replaced the Rules of the Supreme Court (applicable to the High Court of Justice) and the County Court Rules.

Court structure

The three tracks 
All defended cases are allocated to one of three tracks:
 Small Claims Track:  Most claims under £10,000. Note: the normal limit for housing disrepair cases and personal injury claims is £1,000.
 Fast Track: Between £10,000    to £25,000
 Multi Track: Claims for over £25,000, or for lesser money sums where the case involves complex points of law and/or evidence.
Note- The Jackson Reforms of 2013 altered the upper limit of the small claims track and the lower limit of the fast track, from £5,000 to £10,000.

Civil Courts 
Civil matters are heard at first instance (i.e. not appeals) in either the County Court or High Court. The County Court hears all Small Claim and Fast Track cases. County Court centres designated as 'civil trial centres' may also deal with claims allocated to the Multi Track.  Unless the parties agree, cases above £100,000 in value are not usually tried in the County Court.

The High Court has three divisions, namely:
 King's Bench: for contract and tort claims
 Chancery: for disputes involving equity matters such as mortgages, trusts, copyrights, and patents.
 Family: for matrimonial-related disputes and cases relating to children.

Procedure 
The Civil Procedure Rules 1998 set out the rules for each stage of a case. The Rules aim to ensure that, when people sue or are sued, they obtain justice.

Parties are encouraged to disclose the facts of their case prior to starting any court case. A Pre-Action Protocol must be followed. All claims less than £15,000 must be started in the County Court. Claims for more than this amount can be started in either the High court or the County Court, except personal injury claims for less than £50,000, which must be started in the County Court.

Most type of claims are started by issuing a Part 7 claim form in which the claimant states the particulars of case, or attaches the particulars to the claim form, or serves them separately within 14 days of the claim form being served.

There must also be a Statement of Truth as to the facts in the particulars of the claim.  The claim form and the particulars of the claim must be served on the defendant.  Service may be carried by the court or the claimant, and can be made personally, by post, by fax, by e-mail or other electronic means.

Upon service, the defendant has 14 days in which to respond. A defendant may;

a) Pay the amount claimed, b) Admit or partly admit the claim, c) File an acknowledgement of service (but then must file a defence within another 14 days), or d) File a defence.

The defendant must, if not admitting the claim, file a defence which has substance. It is not enough to simply deny the claim. A defence that simply denies is likely to be struck out by the court.

At any point before or during proceedings, either party may make a part 36 offer to settle the claim for damages.

Allocation of cases 
After the defence has been filed, the court sends to all parties a directions questionnaire.  This helps the judge decide the track to which the case should be allocated.

If a party is dissatisfied with the allocation decision an application can be made to court for the claim to be re-allocated.

Small Claims procedure

Cases are heard by a District Judge who will normally use an interventionist approach. This is an approach that allows the court to try to intervene in helping the parties to agree with one another in sorting out the case. Cases are dealt with in a relatively informal way and are now heard in open court (prior to the 1999 reforms small claim cases were heard in private). The use of solicitors is discouraged because the costs of legal representation cannot be recovered from the losing side. There may be a paper adjudication if the judge thinks it appropriate and the parties agree. This approach will often be used where the legal issues and evidence is clear cut, and the parties bring documents they wish to use. In such cases the court will decide the case 'on the papers' without requiring oral evidence or legal argument.

Fast Track procedure

All other cases require a process of 'Pre-Trial Directions' being a timetable for the ongoing management of the case. The idea is to simplify the case for the court. The Fast Track mandates a maximum delay of 30 weeks between the setting of Directions, and the trial date. Normally only one expert witness is allowed and, if the parties cannot agree on an expert, the court has the power to appoint one. The expert's evidence will be given in writing.  There are fixed costs for the advocate at the trial.

Multi Track procedure

There is no standard procedure for Pre-Trial Directions in the Multi Track, and the judge has discretion to use a number of case management approaches, including case management conferences and pre-trial reviews. The aim is to identify the issues as early as possible and, where appropriate, to try specific issues prior to the main trial. The number of expert witnesses is controlled by the court as its permission is needed for any party to use an expert to give evidence. All time limits are strictly enforced. The court may in the directions fix a trial date, or order a trial window (approximate date for the trial) with a date being fixed by the court closer to the trial window period. In the Multi Track there is usually some degree of flexibility to shift the date of a specific direction but, once a trial date is fixed, the court is very unlikely to agree to an adjournment without a compelling reason.

References

Civil procedure
 
Welsh law